The Kerala School of Mathematics (KSoM) in Kozhikode, India is a research institute in Theoretical sciences with a focus on Mathematics. The institute is a joint venture of the  Department of Atomic Energy (DAE) and the Kerala State Council for Science, Technology and Environment (KSCSTE).  Kerala School of Mathematics is a center of advanced research and learning in Mathematics and is a meeting ground for leading Mathematicians from around the world.

History 
Mathematics in Kerala, during the times of Madhava of Sangamagrama, majorly flourished in the Misiris region of Thrikkandiyur, Thirur, Alathiyur and Thirunavaya in the Malabar region of Kerala. Commemorating the rich heritage of Mathematics in the region, Kerala School of Mathematics was hence chosen to be set up in the scenic mountains of the Western Ghats in the city of Kozhikode. 

The nascent plan to set up Kerala School of Mathematics started forming shape in around 2004. The then DAE chairman Anil Kakodkar and the then executive vice president of KSCSTE, M. S. Valiathan were instrumental in setting up the institute with the guidance of M. S. Raghunathan, Rajeeva Karandikar and Alladi Sitaram. The foundation stone of KSoM was laid by the then Chief Minister A.K. Antony in 2004. The institute was later inaugurated in 2008 by the then Chief Minister V. S. Achuthanandan and finally set up in 2009 with Parameswaran A. J. as the founding director.

Academics
Kerala School of Mathematics has a doctoral program to which students are admitted on an yearly basis. The institute also has an Integrated MSc-PhD program with an option for students to exit the program with an MSc degree at the end of two years.

External links
Homepage of KSoM

Faculty members of KSoM

References 

Arts and Science colleges in Kerala
Universities and colleges in Kozhikode
Science and technology in Kozhikode
Educational institutions established in 2009
Research institutes in Kerala
Mathematical institutes
2009 establishments in Kerala
Mathematics education in India